Fuscoptilia hoenei is a moth of the family Pterophoridae. It is found in Yunnan, China.

The wingspan is about 23 mm.

References

Moths described in 1999
Exelastini